Ian Gillespie (born 3 November 1976) is a former English cricketer. Gillespie was a right-handed batsman who bowled right-arm fast-medium. He was born in Shrewsbury, Shropshire.

Gillespie made his debut for Shropshire in the 2002 Minor Counties Championship against Herefordshire. He made a further Minor Counties Championship appearance in 2002, against Oxfordshire. He made his only List A appearance in 2002, against Buckinghamshire in the 2nd of the 2003 Cheltenham & Gloucester Trophy. In this match, he bowled 4 wicket-less overs, while with the bat he ended the Shropshire innings 26 not out. The following season he made his only MCCA Knockout Trophy appearance, against Devon.

References

External links
Ian Gillespie at ESPNcricinfo
Ian Gillespie at CricketArchive

1976 births
Living people
Sportspeople from Shrewsbury
English cricketers
Shropshire cricketers